Jan Tadeusz Tombiński (born 4 October 1958, Kraków) is a Polish historian and diplomat, Poland ambassador to Slovenia (1996–1998), France (2001–2006), permanent representative to the European Union (2007–2012), and EU ambassador to Ukraine (2012–2016) and the Holy See (2016–2020).

Life 

Tombiński in his youth, he was practicing fencing. In 1978, he was Poland junior vice champion in foil. He received his Master titles from German studies (1984) and history (1985) at the Jagiellonian University, Kraków. Shortly after graduation he was employed by the university library, since 1987 he was lecturer at the Jagiellonian University Institute of History.

During 1980s he was active member of Poland dissident movement. Between 1981 and 1984 he was deputy head of the Jagiellonian University Independent Students’ Association. For a short period of time he was there head of the students' union. He was also editor of the illegal self-publishing magazines.

In 1990, Tombiński joined the Ministry of Foreign Affairs. He began his career as the Third Secretary at the embassy in Prague. In 1995, he was posted at the newly formed embassy in Ljubljana, following year being nominated ambassador to Slovenia, accredited also to Bosnia and Herzegovina. From 1998 to 2001 he was director of the MFA Department of Europe. Later, he was ambassador to France (2001–2006) and permanent representative to the European Union (2007–2012). Later, he joined the European External Action Service, serving as an EU ambassador to Ukraine (2012–2016) and the Holy See (2016–2020).

Besides Polish, Tombiński speaks English, German, French, Slovene, Czech, and Ukrainian. He is married to Agnieszka Tombińska, with ten children.

Honours 

 Commander of the Order of Polonia Restituta, Poland, 2012
 Officer of the Ordre des Arts et des Lettres, France, 2005

Works 

 Hitler and the Swiss neutrality 1933–35, Kraków 1989
 Austria and European integration 1926–32, Graz 1989
 Debate on the project of the European Union in the League of Nations, Kraków 1991
 The response of Austria to the Briand Plan, Genewa 1994
 The Polish election law, Praga 1992
 Polish-German Relations 1945–1991, Praga 1994
 Poland – six months after the elections, Bonn 1989
 Polish television towards choice, Stuttgart 1990

References 

1958 births
Ambassadors of Poland to Bosnia and Herzegovina
Ambassadors of Poland to France
Ambassadors of Poland to Slovenia
Ambassadors of the European Union to the Holy See
Ambassadors of the European Union to Ukraine
Commanders of the Order of Polonia Restituta
Jagiellonian University alumni
Academic staff of Jagiellonian University
Living people
Officiers of the Ordre des Arts et des Lettres
Diplomats from Kraków
Permanent Representatives of Poland to the European Union
Polish dissidents
20th-century Polish historians
Polish male non-fiction writers